Prosotsani (until 1925:  - Prosotsani, from 1925 until 1940:  - Pyrsopolis) is a municipality and town within the municipality located in the western part of the Drama regional unit in Greece. The 2011 census reported a population of 9,065 inhabitants for the municipal unit, and 3,553 for the town. A local attraction is the cave at the source of the Angitis River, located at the village of Angitis in the community of Kokkinogeia.

History
Prosotsani is a historic town (and a former center of tobacco production) built on the foot of Menekio mountain. It was a sub-district in the Drama sanjak in the Selanik vilayet as "Pürsıçan" before the Balkan Wars.

Municipality
The municipality Prosotsani was formed at the 2011 local government reform by the merger of the following 2 former municipalities, that became municipal units:
Prosotsani
Sitagroi

Notable people
 FORG1VEN, professional League of Legends player

References

External links
Prosotsani - Official Website

Municipalities of Eastern Macedonia and Thrace
Populated places in Drama (regional unit)